Ariusdius Jais (born 7 July 1998) is a Malaysian professional footballer who plays as a midfielder for Malaysia Premier League club Kelantan United.

On 28 May 2021, Ariusdius signed to Kelantan United on loan deals.

Ariusdius represented Malaysia at 2019 AFF U-22 Youth Championship.

References

External links

1998 births
Living people
Malaysian footballers
People from Sabah
Sabah F.C. (Malaysia) players
Kelantan United F.C. players
Association football midfielders